Roberto Herlitzka (born 2 October 1937) is an Italian theatre and film actor of Czechoslovak descent. He has appeared in 38 films since 1973. He was born in Turin, Piedmont, Italy. In 2004 he won the David di Donatello for Best Supporting Actor and Nastro d'Argento for Best Actor for his role in Good Morning, Night.

Partial filmography

 Love and Anarchy (1973) - Pautasso
 Black Holiday (1973) - Guasco
 Morel's Invention (1974) - Ospite che si scusa
 Seven Beauties (1975) - Socialist
 A Joke of Destiny (1983) - Dr. Crisafulli, segretario
 Il giocatore invisibile (1985)
 Summer Night (1986) - Salvatore Cantalamessa aka Turi
 Dark Eyes (1987) - L'Avvocato
 The Gold Rimmed Glasses (1987)
 Secondo Ponzio Pilato (1987) - Barabba
 The Mask (1988) - Elia
 Traces of an Amorous Life (1990) - Teacher
 In the Name of the Sovereign People (1990) - Giuseppe Gioacchino Belli
 Marcellino (1991) - Il precettore
 The Butterfly's Dream (1994) - Il padre
 The Favourite Son (1994) - Raphaël, le père
 Intolerance (1996) - (segment "Ottantanni di Intolerance")
 Les Démons de Jésus (1997) - Raymond Piacentini
 Marianna Ucrìa (1997) - Duca Pietro
 A ridosso dei ruderi, i Trionfi (1997)
 Mille bornes (1999) - Le père
 Il corpo dell'anima (1999) - Ernesto
 Il mnemonista (2000) - Professor L.
 L'ultima lezione (2000) - Federico Caffè
 Quartetto (2001) - Paolo
 It's Easier for a Camel... (2003) - Father
 Le intermittenze del cuore (2003) - Carlo
 Good Morning, Night (2003) - Aldo Moro
 The Voyage Home (2004) - Protadio
 Secret Journey (2006) - Padre Angelo
 Boris (2007, TV series) - Orlando Serpentieri
 The Demons of St. Petersberg (2008) - Pavlovic
 All Human Rights for All (2008) - Tolik (segment "Art. 9") / Voce narrante (segment "Art. 11")
 Narciso, dietro i cannoni, davanti ai muli (2008) - Ciso
 Aria (2009) - Giovanni
 The Red Shadows (2009) - Sergio Siniscalchi
 Christine Cristina (2009) - Sartorius
 Gli anni verdi (2010) - Guru
 Sette opere di misericordia (2011) - Antonio
 The Last Earthling (2011) - Padre di Luca
 Rien Va (2011) - Alessandro Tommasi
 The Ideal City (2012) - Custode Maneggio
 Dormant Beauty (2012) - Lo psichiatra
 The Red and the Blue (2012) - Prof. Fiorito
 The Great Beauty (2013) - Cardinal Bellucci
 Io, Arlecchino (2014) - Giovanni
 Blood of My Blood (2015) - Conte
 Sweet Dreams (2016) - padre Ettore Abisso
 Non c'è più religione (2016) - Bishop
 Veleni (2017) - Rettore
 Loro (2018) - Crepuscolo
 Primula Rossa (2018) - Cristiano
 Magical Nights (2018) - Fulvio Zappellini
 The Name of the Rose (2019, TV Series) - Alinardo da Grottaferrata
 Il processo (2019, TV Series)

References

External links

1937 births
Living people
Italian male film actors
Italian people of Czech descent
Actors from Turin
Accademia Nazionale di Arte Drammatica Silvio D'Amico alumni
David di Donatello winners
Nastro d'Argento winners